is a former Japanese football player.

Playing career
Kawamae was born in Kagawa Prefecture on August 20, 1971. After graduating from high school, he joined Yanmar Diesel (later Cerezo Osaka) in 1990. He became a regular player as center back from 1991. The club won the champions in 1994 and was promoted to J1 League. However his opportunity to play decreased from 1996 and he could not play at all in the match in 1997. In 1998, he moved to Japan Football League club Sagan Tosu. He became a regular player and the club was promoted to J2 League from 1999. In 2004, he moved to Mito HollyHock. However he could not become a regular player. In 2005, he moved to Japan Football League club ALO's Hokuriku. He played as regular player in 2 seasons and retired end of 2006 season.

Club statistics

References

External links

1971 births
Living people
Association football people from Kagawa Prefecture
Japanese footballers
Japan Soccer League players
J1 League players
J2 League players
Japan Football League (1992–1998) players
Japan Football League players
Cerezo Osaka players
Sagan Tosu players
Mito HollyHock players
Kataller Toyama players
Association football defenders